Iran participated at the 2015 Summer Universiade in Gwangju, South Korea.

Medal summary

Medal by sports

Shooting

Taekwondo

References
 Country overview: Iran on the official website

Nations at the 2015 Summer Universiade
2015
2015 in Iranian sport